Barbacoa or Barbacoas may refer to:

Barbacoa, antecedent food preparation method to barbecue

Colombia
Barbacoas, La Guajira, a village in Riohacha Municipality, La Guajira Department
Barbacoas Municipality, a municipality in Nariño Department, 
Barbacoas, Nariño, a town in Barbacoas Municipality, Nariño Department
Barbacoas, Santander, a village in Santander Department,

Costa Rica
Barbacoas, Costa Rica

Venezuela
Barbacoas, Aragua, a city in Aragua State
Barbacoas, Lara, a village in Morán Municipality, Lara State